Enemies of Reason is a comedy album performed by the Frantics Canadian comedy troupe. The sketches were recorded live in front of an audience at Toronto's Yuk Yuks venue on November 20, 2005. Some of these skits also appeared on "The Frantics Reunion Special" television show, as well as on an episode of CBC Radio One's Madly Off in All Directions.

Personnel
 Paul Chato
 Rick Green
 Dan Redican
 Peter Wildman

Track listing
"Just 5 Minutes"
"Earth Raper"
"Chunder Business School"
"My Lovely Lovely Body"
"New Condo"
"Whenever I'm Near You"
"Some Weather"
"Sex Book"
"P.A.S."
"Magnum Weekend"
"Prostate Song"
"The Saturn Way"
"Clinical Advice"
"Truth Song"
"Barney's Useless Utensils"
"Vagina Bound"

External links
Albums listings on The Frantics official Web site

The Frantics (comedy) albums
2006 albums
2000s comedy albums